The chemical compound 3-methyluridine, also called N3-methyluridine, is a pyrimidine nucleoside (abbreviated m3U). In living organisms it is present as RNA modification which has been detected in 23S rRNA of archaea, 16S and 23S rRNA of eubacteria, and 18S, 25S, and 28S of eukaryotic ribosomal RNAs.

See also
 5-Methyluridine

References

Nucleosides
Pyrimidinediones